Ensemble Studio6 is group of internationally active musicians dedicated to new music, based in Serbia. The ensemble founded in 2013 by trumpeter Nenad Marković and harpist Milana Zarić, and they had its first performance the same year in the Studio 6 of Radio Belgrade.

The ensemble works closely with Richard Barrett giving the premiere performances of his latest work.

Members and associates of ensemble

Nenad Marković, trumpet

Milana Zarić, harp

Karolina Bäter, recorder

Vladimir Blagojević, accordion

Ivana Grahovac, cello

Svetlana Maraš, electronics, composition

Richard Barrett, electronics, composition

Teodora Stepančić, piano, composition

Milena Pavlović, piano

Jasna Veličković, electronics, composition

Borislav Čičovački, oboe

Notes and references

External links
 Official website

Serbian musical groups
Musical groups established in 2013
New music organizations
2013 establishments in Serbia